Lieutenant-Colonel Archibald Campbell, 1st Baron Blythswood,  (22 February 1835 – 8 July 1908) was a Scottish soldier, Tory politician, scientist and Grand Master of the Grand Lodge of Scotland.

Life

Born Archibald Campbell Douglas (he dropped Douglas from his name in 1838) in Florence, Tuscany, he was the son of Archibald Campbell, 17th Laird of Mains, until 1838 known as Archibald Douglas.

Campbell joined the 79th Highlanders at the age of 16 and fought in the Crimean War in 1855, where he was severely wounded. He transferred to the Scots Fusilier Guards and rose to the rank of lieutenant-colonel. On 7 July 1864, he married Augusta Clementina Carrington, a daughter of Robert Carrington, 2nd Baron Carrington, at Whitehall Chapel, London. He retired from the army in 1868 on the death of his father.

He was Member of Parliament (MP) for Renfrewshire from 1873 to 1874, and for West Renfrewshire from 1885 to 1892. He was also Lord Lieutenant of Renfrewshire from 1904 to 1908.  On 4 May 1880, he was created a baronet, of Blythswood and was an aide-de-camp to Queen Victoria. In 1888 he was awarded an honorary doctorate of Law from the University of Glasgow and made a Freeman of the City of Glasgow. He was conferred with Honorary Membership of the Institution of Engineers and Shipbuilders in Scotland in 1891. On 24 August 1892, he was created Baron Blythswood, with a special remainder to his five younger brothers.

He was a notable scientist and took his wife to Thebes to observe the Transit of Venus in 1874, taking with him a small transit instrument, a 6-inch telescope and a 12-inch telescope, recording the time of first contact, and also observed a white halo, proving an atmosphere around Venus. From 1892 to 1905 the Blythswood Laboratory at his family seat was used to experiment into many areas at the borders of physics, including the use of cathode rays, X-rays, spectroscopy and radioactivity. He designed a speed indicator, which was fitted to ships of the Royal Navy, and carried out studies into the efficiency of aerial propellers some years before the Wright Brothers' first powered flight in 1903. He was elected a Fellow of the Royal Society in May, 1907 and died possessed of the family seat in Renfrewshire and Halliford Manor in Shepperton.

He was for many years linked to the 3rd (The Blythswood) Volunteer Battalion of the Highland Light Infantry, where he was commanding Colonel, and from 28 May 1902 appointed Honorary Colonel.

He died at age 73 at his home Blythswood House, Renfrewshire, without issue and was buried on 11 July 1908 at Inchinnan. His baronetcy became extinct but his barony passed to his brother, Rev. Sholto Campbell, succeeded by younger brothers still, Barrington and Archibald.

See also
List of Fellows of the Royal Society

References

External links 
 
 Who's Who in Glasgow 1909 Glasgow Digital Library, hosted by University of Strathclyde

1835 births
1908 deaths
1
19th-century Scottish people
Military personnel from Glasgow
British Army personnel of the Crimean War
Members of the Parliament of the United Kingdom for Scottish constituencies
Lord-Lieutenants of Renfrewshire
Fellows of the Royal Society
Scottish soldiers
Politics of Renfrewshire
Scots Guards officers
Scottish expatriates in Italy
Scottish physicists
Scottish inventors
Scottish Tory MPs (pre-1912)
UK MPs 1868–1874
UK MPs 1885–1886
UK MPs 1886–1892
UK MPs who were granted peerages
Queen's Own Cameron Highlanders officers
Peers of the United Kingdom created by Queen Victoria